Musée d'Orsay is a station in line C of the Paris Region's Réseau express régional (RER) rapid transit system, named after the Musée d'Orsay. It is in the 7th arrondissement of Paris. It was one of several stations attacked during the 1995 Paris Métro and RER bombings. Its precursor the Gare d'Orsay was the world's first electrified train station.

Adjacent stations
Assemblée Nationale and Solférino on Paris Métro Line 12 are both within walking distance.

See also
 List of stations of the Paris Métro
 Gare d'Orsay

External links

 

Réseau Express Régional stations
Buildings and structures in the 7th arrondissement of Paris
Railway stations in France opened in 1900

ja:ミュゼ・ドルセー駅